Stine Maiken Brix (born 3 April 1982 in Glostrup) is a Danish politician, who was a member of the Folketing for the Red–Green Alliance from 2011 to 2019.

Political career
Brix was first elected into parliament at the 2011 Danish general election, where she received 2,667. She was reelected in 2015 with 5.762 votes. She did not run in the 2019 election.

References

External links 
 on the website of the Danish Parliament (Folketinget)

Living people
1982 births
People from Glostrup Municipality
Red–Green Alliance (Denmark) politicians
21st-century Danish women politicians
Women members of the Folketing
Members of the Folketing 2011–2015
Members of the Folketing 2015–2019
20th-century Danish women